FC Nasaf-2 Qarshi is an Uzbekistann association football club based in Qarshi. Nasaf-2 is the farm club of Nasaf Qarshi. Currently it plays in First League.

History
Nasaf-2 was formed with intention to feed and provide Nasaf Qarshi with young successful players. Club plays in First League, conference West and participate in Uzbek Cup.

On 20 July 2012, the current head coach of Nasaf-2, Shuhrat Toshpulatov was appointed as assistant coach of Nasaf Youth team and resigned his position at Nasaf-2. Club had appointed Rakhmatulla Muhammedrakhimov as new head coach.

Managerial history

References

External links
 Nasaf Qarshi F.C. official website

Football clubs in Uzbekistan